Michael Gruber (born 1965 in Mallersdorf, Germany) is a German painter, installation artist and sculptor.

Biography
After graduating from an apprenticeship as sculptor he majored in sculpture at the Academy of Fine Arts, Munich. He was taught there by Hans Ladner, Antony Gormley, Asta Gröting and Timm Ulrichs.

Since 1995 he has worked in Munich with his partner Corbinian Böhm under the name Empfangshalle.

In 1999 he got his "Meisterschüler" diplom (comparable with a Master of Fine Arts degree).

See also
 List of German painters

References

External links 

 

German installation artists
20th-century German painters
German male painters
21st-century German painters
21st-century German male artists
20th-century German sculptors
20th-century German male artists
German male sculptors
21st-century sculptors
Artists from Munich
1965 births
Living people
Academy of Fine Arts, Munich alumni
People from Straubing-Bogen